Emil Ursu (born 14 January 1964) is a Romanian football manager and former player. Most recently, he was the head coach of Liga III side Dinamo II București.

In his playing career, he played as a midfielder.

After he ended his playing career he worked as a manager, mainly at teams from the Romanian lower leagues, with a short spell in the first league at Concordia Chiajna.

Honours

Player
Victoria București
Divizia B: 1984–85

Notes

References

1964 births
Living people
Romanian footballers
Association football midfielders
Liga I players
Liga II players
Victoria București players
FCM Bacău players
FC Argeș Pitești players
FC Progresul București players
CSM Unirea Alba Iulia players
FC Dunărea Călărași players
Romanian football managers
LPS HD Clinceni managers
CS Concordia Chiajna managers